MetroCard is a fare card used on subways, buses, and other public transport in the New York metropolitan area. Other fare cards known as the METROcard, MetroCard or Metrocard:
Metrocard (Adelaide), launched in 2012–2013 on Adelaide Metro buses, trams, and trains in Adelaide, Australia
METROcard, which was used on the Metro Monorail and light rail in Sydney, Australia
MetroCard, used in several Tokyo subway systems in Japan, replaced in 1988–2007 by the Pasmo RFID card
Metrocard, used on buses on public transport routes in Christchurch and Timaru, New Zealand, under the "Metro" branding